Warren Shouldice (born April 1, 1983 in Calgary) is a retired Canadian freestyle skier. Over his career, Shouldice has earned twelve podium finishes at World Cup events. His best result came in 2011, when he won the World Championships in Deer Valley Utah.  Shouldice won his first World Championship medal in 2009, a bronze.

Shouldice  competes in aerials, and made his World Cup debut in January 2003. His first podium came a year later, when he finished second in an event at Mont Tremblant. His first,  World Cup victory came in December 2005 in Changchun.  Shouldice also won a memorable World Cup event in his hometown of Calgary in 2011.

Shouldice competed in the 2006 Olympic Games and 2010 Olympic Games. In Torino he qualified in 3rd place, and recorded the 6th highest score on each of his two jumps in the final, en route to 6th place overall. He finished 10th at the Olympics in Vancouver, after touching back on one of his jumps. Shouldice followed Olympic disappointment by winning a World Championship title the following season. He landed a perfect lay triple full full and described the victory as "I'm the only one who does that jump in the whole world, and I got a perfect score on it right here tonight. This can't be happening. This only happens in fairy tales and my dreams. It can't be for real." Since retiring in 2012, Shouldice has gone on to a successful career as a real estate agent in his hometown of Calgary, AB.

World Cup Podiums

References

External links
 FIS profile

1983 births
Living people
Olympic freestyle skiers of Canada
Freestyle skiers at the 2006 Winter Olympics
Skiers from Calgary
Canadian male freestyle skiers